Couleé-D is an extended play (EP) by American drag performer Shea Couleé, released on June 23, 2017. Ahead of the EP's release, music videos co-directed by Shea Couleé were released for all three songs on June 22. The collection was produced by Shea Couleé and VAM studio. Fellow RuPaul's Drag Race contestant The Vixen is featured on the track "Cocky".

Composition and production

The visual album Couleé-D has three tracks with accompanying music videos: "Ride", "Cocky", featuring fellow RuPaul's Drag Race contestant The Vixen as well as Lila Star, and "Feeling So". She recorded a total of eleven tracks, but decided not to release a larger collection. She said, "There [are] all these different sounds and different vibes—there's also really great stuff that's unreleased that I'm holding onto because I think what I want to do is to just release smaller albums, EPs and then have visuals for all them and continue telling the stories."

According to Out'''s Rose Dommu, the EP "doesn't have a particular narrative' and offers "three distinct elements of Couleé’s drag persona". The videos were co-produced by Shea Couleé and the Chicago-based production company VAM, and filmed locally immediately following her appearance of RuPaul's DragCon LA.

Songs
Shea Couleé has said of the opening track, "'Ride' is the really laid back band-jam homegirl jam that she would listen to [while] smoking a blunt with your friends—just like chilling at a cookout". She said of the second song: "'Cocky' actually came about because [during Drag Race], there was a contestant that had been kinda running her mouth in the streets about me and calling me 'Cocky' after her exit. I've always prided myself on being able to maintain a sense of humility and perspective about my abilities and what it is that I can do as an artist and performer. So I was really like, 'Oh yeah girl?'"

On the origins of the EP's third and final track, Shea Couleé has recalled: 

Release and promotion
The EP was released unexpectedly on June 23, 2017, coinciding with the finale of the ninth season of RuPaul's Drag Race, preceded only by Out exclusive release of the three accompanying music videos on June 22.

Reception
James Besanvalle of Gay Star News said the EP and accompanying music videos, "all with very different vibes", "show a unique diversity" of Shea Couleé and "[prove] she's a triple threat – she can dance, sing and act". Out Rose Dommu said the music videos "[cement] her as one of the most versatile, talented and hard-working queens in Drag Race'' herstory".

Track listing

Track listing adapted from the Apple Store and Spotify

References

External links

  (June 22, 2017)

2017 EPs
Shea Couleé albums
Self-released EPs